The Leader of the House in the Tamil Nadu Legislative Assembly is an elected Member of Legislative Assembly who leads the ruling party in the Tamil Nadu Legislative Assembly. The Leader of the House in the Tamil Nadu Legislative Assembly is the chairperson of the legislative assembly's largest political party, which is part of the government of Tamil Nadu. A minister will be appointed by the government as the Leader of the House. Rules of Procedure provide that the Speaker of the legislative assembly shall consult the Leader of the House before allocating time for discussion of certain items of business. The arrangement of government business is his ultimate responsibility. His foremost duty is to assist the Speaker in the conduct of business.

Since 1952, the Tamil Nadu Legislative Assembly has had 12 leaders of the house. Former Minister of Defence of the Republic of India C. Subramaniam of the Indian National Congress was the inaugural holder of the office of leader of the house as Madras State Legislative Assembly. Former acting chief minister of Tamil Nadu V. R. Nedunchezhiyan, the longest-serving leader of the house, was chosen from both Dravidian parties, the Dravida Munnetra Kazhagam and the All India Anna Dravida Munnetra Kazhagam, which ruled Tamil Nadu for several periods of time. K. Anbazhagan from the Dravida Munnetra Kazhagam has the second longest tenure. R. M. Veerappan has the shortest tenure (only 23 days). M. Bhakthavatsalam served as the leader of house before serving as chief minister.M. Karunanidhi, and O. Panneerselvam are the former chief ministers of Tamil Nadu who also were designated as leaders of the house in the Tamil Nadu Legislative Assembly.

The current incumbent has been Duraimurugan of the Dravida Munnetra Kazhagam since 11 May 2021.

List
Key
 Resigned
 Died in office
 Returned to office after a previous non-consecutive term
Legend

See also
History of Tamil Nadu
Elections in Tamil Nadu
List of governors of Tamil Nadu
Chief Secretariat of Tamil Nadu
Tamil Nadu Legislative Assembly
List of chief ministers of Tamil Nadu
List of deputy chief ministers of Tamil Nadu
List of speakers of the Tamil Nadu Legislative Assembly
List of leaders of the opposition in the Tamil Nadu Legislative Assembly

References

Politics of Tamil Nadu
Members of the Tamil Nadu Legislative Assembly
Tamil Nadu Legislative Assembly